Potenza Centrale railway station, formerly known as Potenza Inferiore, is the main station serving the city and comune of Potenza, in the region of Basilicata, southern Italy.  Opened in 1880, it forms part of the Battipaglia–Potenza–Metaponto railway and is also a junction of a branch line to Foggia.

Overview
The station is currently managed by Rete Ferroviaria Italiana (RFI).  However, the commercial area of the passenger building is managed by Centostazioni.  Standard gauge train services are operated by Trenitalia.  Each of these companies is a subsidiary of Ferrovie dello Stato (FS), Italy's state-owned rail company.

Narrow gauge train services to the nearby station of "Potenza Inferiore" are operated by Ferrovie Appulo Lucane, a separate company. Another nearby station is "Potenza Inferiore Scalo". Both stations are operated by the local suburban railway.

Location
Potenza Centrale railway station is situated in Piazzale Guglielmo Marconi, to the south of the city centre.

History
The station was opened on 1 September 1880, upon the inauguration of the Picerno–Potenza section of the Battipaglia–Potenza–Metaponto railway, a line linking it directly with Salerno and Taranto.

Until 10 December 2006, it was named Statione di Potenza Inferiore, as it is in the lower elevations of the city, adjacent to the Basento river.

Features
The passenger building is made up of three conjoined sections, each constructed of brick.  The two single storey outer sections extend symmetrically from the two storey central section, which also has a raised facade.  Inside the central section are the main entrance, lobby, ticket office and waiting room.  The outer sections house other services, including a bar.

The station yard has three tracks with platforms for passenger services, and also many other tracks.  The passenger building and platform 1 are connected with the other platforms by a pedestrian underpass.  To the east, towards Metaponto, there is a small locomotive shed with refueling facilities.  In the other direction, towards Battipaglia, there are several small buildings used for various technical purposes, and above them the concrete Musmeci viaduct, which provides road access to the city.

The station has recently been the subject of a redevelopment project under the Centostazioni program.  It will shortly also undergo work on its connection with the bus routes in Via Nazario Sauro, through a line of escalators and underground passageways.

Train services
The station has about 950,000 passenger movements each year.

Some of the trains that stop at the station provide long distance links with major cities such as Rome and Naples, and also with the region of Apulia.  The more common regional trains link Potenza with closer destinations, including Salerno, Naples, Melfi, Foggia and Taranto.

The station is served by the following service(s):

Intercity services Rome - Naples - Salerno - Taranto
Regional services (Treno regionale) Naples - Salerno - Potenza - Metaponto - Taranto
Regional services (Treno regionale) Foggia - Melfi - Potenza

See also

Matera Centrale railway station
History of rail transport in Italy
Rail transport in Italy
Railway stations in Italy
List of railway stations in Basilicata

References

External links

Description and pictures of Potenza Centrale railway station 

This article is based upon a translation of the Italian language version as at December 2010.

Railway station
Railway stations in Basilicata
Railway stations opened in 1880
Buildings and structures in the Province of Potenza